NOTD (pronounced "noted")  is a Swedish musical production duo composed of Tobias Danielsson and Samuel Brandt. They are best known for their songs "I Wanna Know" featuring Bea Miller and "So Close" with Felix Jaehn featuring Captain Cuts and Georgia Ku.

Background
The duo met on SoundCloud and began creating remixes together before they found out they would be attending the same high school. The duo chose the name NOTD by combining the last two letters of each of their last names and reversing them.

Their remix of "Scars to Your Beautiful" by Alessia Cara was released in 2016. A remix of "Dark Side" by Phoebe Ryan was released in 2017. Their remix of STANAJ's "Romantic", which peaked at #91 in Australia (as "The Preview EP") was released on 27 January 2017.  Their remix of "There's Nothing Holdin' Me Back" by Shawn Mendes was released in May 2017. Their remix of "Shape of You" by Ed Sheeran received a nomination for an Electronic Music Award for Remix of the Year. Also in 2017, they released a remix of "Wild Thoughts" by DJ Khaled and Rihanna, which appeared on Billboard's list of the best remixes of the song. They released their debut single "Summer of Love" which features Norwegian singer Dagny on 11 August 2017. In December 2017, they released a remix of "Tell Me You Love Me" by Demi Lovato. They also produced a remix of Years & Years' song "If You're Over Me".

Their second single "I Wanna Know" featuring Bea Miller was released in March 2018. The song charted in several countries, including Australia, Canada, and Sweden. Their single "Been There Done That" with Tove Styrke was released in August.

The duo and Felix Jaehn released the single "So Close", with a music video starring Sports Illustrated Swimsuit cover girl Camille Kostek.

Discography

Singles

Awards and nominations

References

Musical groups established in 2017
Swedish electronic music groups
Swedish musical duos
Swedish record producers
2017 establishments in Sweden